Julius Caesar is the third album by Bill Callahan (also known as Smog), released in 1993 on Drag City. It was re-released in Europe in 2001 on Domino Records. After his two first LPs, which were recorded at home with an experimental lo-fi approach, Callahan decided to record this album in a professional studio. Nevertheless, he kept control over the recording process, with only Kim Osterwalder helping out on cello.

The song "One Less Star" appeared in Above the Below, a 2003-documentary about a stunt by David Blaine. "Chosen One" was covered live by The Flaming Lips in a record store in Minneapolis on December 12, 1993, a recording which later appeared on their EP Due to High Expectations... the Flaming Lips Are Providing Needles for Your Balloons. The song also appeared (as a Peel Session) on Callahan's rarities compilation Accumulation: None in 2002.

The song "37 Push Ups" appeared in the record company Kill Rock Stars' compilation album, Rock Stars Kill.

Track listing

References

External links
 

1993 albums
Bill Callahan (musician) albums
Drag City (record label) albums
Domino Recording Company albums